Melvin Berman may refer to:
 Melvin Berman (musician) (1927–2008), American oboist of the Montreal Symphony Orchestra
 Melvin J. Berman (1915–1996), American land developer